Hermit Mountain is a  mountain summit located in Glacier National Park, in the Hermit Range of the Selkirk Mountains in British Columbia, Canada. The nearest higher peak is Swiss Peak on Mount Rogers,  to the west. The first ascent of the mountain was made August 4, 1904, by Alex M. Gordon, Samuel Harper Gray, James C. Herdman, Edward Feuz, and Edward Feuz Jr. via the Southeast Couloir. The mountain's name was adopted in 1904, then re-approved September 8, 1932, by the Geographical Names Board of Canada.

Climate
Based on the Köppen climate classification, Hermit Mountain is located in a subarctic climate zone with cold, snowy winters, and mild summers. Winter temperatures can drop below −20 °C with wind chill factors below −30 °C. This climate supports the Tupper Glacier on the south slope, Hermit Glacier on the north aspect, and an unnamed glacier in the east cirque. Precipitation runoff from the mountain and meltwater from these surrounding glaciers on its slopes drains into tributaries of the Beaver River.

Climbing Routes
Established climbing routes on Hermit Mountain:

 Southeast Couloir -  First ascent 1904
 South Couloir -  FA 1904
 West Ridge - class 5  FA 1920
 Rogers-Hermit Traverse - class 5 FA 1925
 Southeast Ridge - class 4 FA 1936

See also

 Geography of British Columbia
 Geology of British Columbia

References

External links
 Weather: Hermit Mountain

Three-thousanders of British Columbia
Selkirk Mountains
Glacier National Park (Canada)
Columbia Country